Ulu-Telyak (Olo Teläk) is a rural locality (a selo) and the administrative centre of Ulu-Telyaksky Selsoviet, Iglinsky District, Bashkortostan, Russia. The population was 3,408 as of 2010. There are 48 streets.

Geography 
Ulu-Telyak is located 53 km northeast of Iglino (the district's administrative centre) by road. Kirovsky is the nearest rural locality.

References 

Rural localities in Iglinsky District